Karl Heinrich Wilhelm Koppe (15 June 1896 – 2 July 1975) was a German Nazi commander (Höhere SS und Polizeiführer (HSSPF), SS-Obergruppenführer). He was responsible for numerous atrocities against Poles and Jews in Reichsgau Wartheland and the General Government during the German occupation of Poland in World War II.

Biography
Koppe was born in Hildesheim near Hanover. He fought in the First World War. During the interwar period, he pursued a career in trade and wholesale. He joined the Nazi Party in 1930, then the Storm Detachment (Sturmabteilung, SA) in 1931, and the Schutzstaffel (SS) in 1932. Prior to World War II, he was a regional SS and SD commander first in Münster, then in the Free City of Danzig, Dresden and Leipzig.

The German invasion of Poland took place in September 1939, and in October Koppe became the SS and Police Leader in Reichsgau Wartheland under the command of Gauleiter Arthur Greiser. However, because of the confusing power struggle – with Hitler dividing and ruling via his constantly changing favourites – Koppe had the same power and responsibilities as Greiser. He had a good working relationship with Reichsführer SS Heinrich Himmler. He had a daughter, Ursula, who married an aristocrat Arnold Freiherr von Rotberg, a lieutenant colonel in the German armed forces and descendant of Bavarian war minister Eduard Anton Freiherr von Rotberg.

SS ranks
 Truppführer: 2 January 1932 (renamed to Oberscharführer)
 Sturmhauptführer: 1 September 1932 (renamed to Hauptsturmführer.)
 Sturmbannführer: 30 January 1933
 Standartenführer: 20 April 1933
 Oberführer: 20 April 1934
 Brigadeführer: 23 August 1934
 Gruppenführer: 13 September 1936
 Gruppenführer und Generalleutnant der Polizei: 20 April 1941
 Obergruppenführer und General der Polizei: 30 January 1942
 General der Waffen-SS: 1 July 1944

Occupied Poland

The newly appointed police commander was an active participant in the implementation of Nazi racial ideals, and in November 1939 he declared that he would make Poznań (Posen) 'free from Jews' (judenrein), after which he ordered numerous executions and deportations of Poles and Polish Jews. He participated in the Nazi's euthanasia program as the overall commander of 'Special Detachment (Sonderkommando) Lange', an SS squad which gassed 1,558 patients from mental asylums at the Soldau concentration camp in the nearby Gau of East Prussia during May and June 1940.

On 30 January 1942 he was promoted to SS-Obergruppenführer, and in October 1943 he replaced Friedrich-Wilhelm Krüger as Höhere SS und Polizeiführer in the General Government with headquarters in Kraków. He also held the position of state secretary on the issues of security (Staatssekretär für das Sicherheitswesen) in the General Government, and was involved in the operations of Chelmno extermination camp and Warsaw concentration camp as well as operations against the Polish resistance. He organized the execution of more than 30,000 Polish patients suffering from tuberculosis, and ordered that all male relatives of identified resistance fighters should be executed, and the rest of their family sent to Nazi concentration camps.

The Polish Secret State ordered his death. An attempted assassination resulted in his being wounded by the Kedyw unit – Battatlion Parasol in "Operation Koppe" ("Akcja Koppe") part of "Operation Heads" on 11 July 1944 in Kraków. With the Eastern Front approaching Poland, Koppe ordered all prisoners to be executed rather than freed by the Soviets.

In 1945 Koppe went underground and assumed an alias (Lohmann, his wife's surname) and became a director of a chocolate factory in Bonn, Germany. In 1960 he was arrested but released on bail on 19 April 1962. His trial opened in 1964 in Bonn. He was accused of being an accessory to the mass murder of 145,000 people. The trial was adjourned due to Koppe's purported ill health and in 1966 the Bonn court decided not to prosecute and Koppe was released for medical reasons. The German government refused a Polish request for extradition. Koppe died in 1975, aged 79, in Bonn.

See also
Holocaust in Poland
List SS-Obergruppenführer

Notes

References
 Arendt, Hannah (1992). Eichmann in Jerusalem: A Report on the Banality of Evil. Penguin Classics. . Google Books link.
 Datner, Szymon, Wilhelm Koppe - nieukarany zbrodniarz hitlerowski. Warszawa-Poznań, 1963
 de Mildt, Dick; de Mildt, Dirk Welmoed (1996). In the Name of the People: Perpetrators of Genocide...]. Martinus Nijhoff Publishers. . Google Books link.
 Kania, Stanisław, Zbrodnie hitlerowskie w Polsce. Główna Komisja Badania Zbrodni Hitlerowskich w Polsce, Warszawa, 1983
 Kershaw, Ian (2000). Hitler 1936-1945: Nemesis. New York: W.W. Norton & Company, Inc. . Google Books link.
 Madajczyk, Czesław, Polityka III Rzeszy w okupowanej Polsce. Państwowe Wydawnictwo Naukowe, Warszawa, 1970

External links

11 documents issued by Koppe in the Nuremberg Trials Project
Profile 
Grave of Karl Heinrich Wilhelm Koppe

1896 births
1975 deaths
German Army personnel of World War I
SS and Police Leaders
People from Hildesheim
People from the Province of Hanover
Aktion T4 personnel
Members of the Reichstag of Nazi Germany
Prussian Army personnel
Reich Security Main Office personnel
Holocaust perpetrators in Poland
Waffen-SS personnel
SS-Obergruppenführer